A referendum on joining the European Union was held in Slovakia on 16 and 17 May 2003. It was approved by 93.7% of those voting, and Slovakia  subsequently joined the EU on 1 May 2004. It remains the only referendum in the country's history to have not failed due to insufficient voter turnout.

Results

References

2003 referendums
Referendums in Slovakia
Referendums related to European Union accession
2003 in Slovakia
2003 in international relations
2003 in the European Union
Slovakia and the European Union
May 2003 events in Europe